The Fakour-90 is an Iranian air-to-air missile based on the AIM-54 Phoenix. It is solely deployed on Iran's F-14 Tomcats. While not confirmed for use in service, it has also been tested for usage on Iranian MiG-29s.

History
The missile was developed by the Iranian Army, the Ministry of Defence and Armed Forces Logistics, and the Air Force. In October 2011, Iran announced that the missile had reached the stage of mass production.

In April 2017, Fakour-90 long range air to air missile was officially unveiled during a visit by Hassan Rouhani from exhibition of latest achievements of defense ministry of Iran. Iran's state TV showed a video related to this exhibition including test firing a Fakour-90 missile by an F-14 Tomcat of IRIAF.

On 23 July 2018, the Iranian military announced the Fakour radar-guided air-to-air missile was now being mass-produced. A ceremony attended by Iranian defence minister Amir Hatami was held to mark the announcement, during which at least six missiles were displayed as well as the front ends of another five. Hatami claimed the missile could be used with a variety of aircraft. The Iranian media reported that it has a range of 150 km, a speed of Mach 5, and a guidance system that enables it to hit a target independently of the launch aircraft's radar.

Although most sources reported that the Fakour-90 is a copy of the AIM-54, some analysts suggested that the Fakour-90 was actually an air-launched version of the MIM-23 Hawk missile with control surfaces from the AIM-54. The Fakour-90 was also criticized for having less range than the original AIM-54 missiles.

References

External links 

https://militarywatchmagazine.com/article/the-iranian-air-force-s-greatest-asset-lethal-fakour-90-air-to-air-missiles-put-into-mass-production

Air-to-air missiles of Iran
Military equipment introduced in the 2010s